Max von Sydow (1929–2020) was a Swedish-French actor, active in both European and American Cinema. 

Sydow started his cinematic career in his native country in 1949 and one his most memorable roles include Knight Antonius Block in The Seventh Seal (1957), the first of his eleven films with Ingmar Bergman, and the film that includes the iconic scenes in which he plays chess with Death;and Martin in Through a Glass Darkly (1961);

In Hollywood he starred in roles starting from 1965, notably his debut as Jesus Christ in The Greatest Story Ever Told (1965), the Condor (1975); Ming the Merciless in Flash Gordon (1980); the villain Ernst Stavro Blofeld in the James Bond film Never Say Never Again (1983); Liet-Kynes in Dune (1984); Dr. Peter Ingham in Awakenings (1990); Lamar Burgess in Minority Report (2002) and Lor San Tekka in Star Wars: The Force Awakens (2015). 

He was nominated for two Academy Awards, for his roles as Lassefar in Pelle the Conqueror (1987) and The Renter in Extremely Loud and Incredibly Close (2012). On television, Sydow played the Three-eyed Raven in Game of Thrones. In 2011, he voiced Esbern in the video game The Elder Scrolls V: Skyrim.

Film

Television

Video games

</onlyinclude>

References

Male actor filmographies